The Hersbrucker Alb ("Hersbruck Jura") – also called Hersbrucker Schweiz ("Hersbruck Switzerland") or Pegnitz-Alb ("Pegnitz Jura") –  is the northeastern part of the Franconian Jura near the town of Hersbruck. The River Pegnitz and its tributaries flow through the region.

Location 
In the west the Hersbrucker Alb reaches the valley of the Schnaittach. It is bounded by the course of the Pegnitz and  Hiltpoltstein to the west, Betzenstein to the north,  Auerbach in der Oberpfalz and Sulzbach-Rosenberg to the east and Alfeld (Mittelfranken) to the south. Much of it lies within the Bavarian provinces of Middle Franconia and the Upper Palatinate; a small part is in Upper Franconia.

The Hersbrucker Alb is formed from the White Jura platform of hard, brittle and karstified massive and Corallian Limestones and the Franconian dolomite together with their more recent depositions. Numerous caves and a striking rock landscape have resulted in the area being referred to as "Hersbruck Switzerland" (Hersbrucker Schweiz, formerly Nürnberger Schweiz). The Hersbrucker Alb is part of the Northern Franconian Jura climbing area. The term Alb may come from the Latin montes albi ("white mountains"). The term is however probably an old Celtic word meaning "mountain meadow".

The Ossinger  is the highest point of the Hersbrucker Alb.

Literature 
 Eckhardt Pfeiffer: Hersbrucker Alb (2001), Pfeiffer Verlag, 2001, 
 Friedrich Herrmann: Höhlen der Fränkischen und Hersbrucker Schweiz. Regensburg, 1980
 Hardy Schabdach: Unterirdische Welten - Höhlen der Fränkischen und Hersbrucker Schweiz. Verlag Reinhold Lippert, Ebermannstadt, 2000

Maps 
 No.53 Sheet South. Veldensteiner Forst, Hersbrucker Alb. 
 No.72 Hersbrucker Alb in der Frankenalb, Pegnitz- und Hirschbachtal.

External links 

 Tourism portal for the Hersbrucker Schweiz: natural monuments

Central Uplands
Regions of Bavaria
 
Mountain ranges of Bavaria